Jonathan is a 2016 German drama film directed by Piotr J. Lewandowski. It was screened in the Panorama section at the 66th Berlin International Film Festival.

Cast
 Jannis Niewöhner as Jonathan
 André Hennicke as Burkhard
 Julia Koschitz as Anka
 Thomas Sarbacher as Ron
 Barbara Auer as Martha
 Max Mauff as Lasse
 Leon Seidel as Maik

References

External links
 

2016 films
2016 drama films
German drama films
2010s German-language films
German LGBT-related films
LGBT-related drama films
2016 LGBT-related films
Gay-related films
2010s German films